

Sovereign states

A
Adiabene
Aksum - 
Alamannia
Albania
Araba - 
 Armenia - 
Atropatene

B
Baekje
Bastarnae
Blemmyes
Buyeo -

C
Cao Wei
Carmania
Caspiane
Cat - 
Ce - 
Champa
Characene
Chera - 
Chi Tu
Chouchi
Cimmerian Bosporus - 
Connacht
Corduene
Cornovii

D
Dayuan

E
Elymais

F
Fergana
Fortriu - 
Franks
Funan

G
Gaetuli
Gangga Negara
Garamantes
Gardman
Gaya - 
Gelonians
Getae
 Ghassanids
Goguryeo

H
Hadhramaut
Huns

I
Iberia - 
Indo-Scythians
Iverni

J
Japan

K
Kangju
Khotan - 
Kindah
Kucha
Kuninda - 
Kush - 
Kushan Empire

L
Langkasuka
Lazica

M
Magyar
Mahan - 
Mauretania
Maya - 
Meath - 
Moche -

N
Nazca
Nok

O
Okjeo
Osraige
Osroene

P
Paeonia
Pallava dynasty
Parthian Empire
Picts
Pueblo
Pundravardhana
Pyu city-states

Q
Qedarite

R
Rajarata
Roman Empire
Principality of Ruhuna -

S
Samhan
Sao civilisation
Sarmatians
Saxons
Shu Han 
Shule - 
Siljik
Silla
Suebi
Sumpa

T
Teotihuacan
Thaton -

V
Vandals
Vanga - 
Vistula Veneti

W
Western Satraps

X
Xianbei -

Y
Yamatai

Z
Zabdicene
Zapotec -